Courts of Arkansas include:
;State courts of Arkansas
Arkansas Supreme Court
Arkansas Court of Appeals
Arkansas Circuit Courts (23 judicial circuits)
Arkansas District Courts (formerly Arkansas Municipal Courts) 
Arkansas City Courts

Federal courts located in Arkansas
United States District Court for the Eastern District of Arkansas
United States District Court for the Western District of Arkansas
United States Bankruptcy Court for the Eastern and Western Districts of Arkansas

Former federal courts of Arkansas
United States District Court for the District of Arkansas (extinct, subdivided)

References

External links
National Center for State Courts – directory of state court websites.

Courts in the United States